Filistatinella is a genus of North American crevice weavers that was first described by Willis J. Gertsch & Wilton Ivie in 1936.

Species
 it contains ten species:
Filistatinella chilindrina Magalhaes & Ramírez, 2017 – Mexico
Filistatinella crassipalpis (Gertsch, 1935) (type) – Southern Texas
Filistatinella domestica Desales-Lara, 2012 – Mexico
Filistatinella hermosa Magalhaes & Ramírez, 2017 – USA
Filistatinella howdyall Magalhaes & Ramírez, 2017 – USA
Filistatinella kahloae Magalhaes & Ramírez, 2017 – Mexico
Filistatinella palaciosi Jiménez & Palacios-Cardiel, 2012 – Mexico
Filistatinella pistrix Magalhaes & Ramírez, 2017 – USA
Filistatinella spatulata Magalhaes & Ramírez, 2017 – USA, Mexico
Filistatinella tohono Magalhaes & Ramírez, 2017 – USA

References

Araneomorphae genera
Filistatidae
Spiders of Mexico
Spiders of the United States